Cyra may refer to:

Cyra (beetle), a genus of ladybird beetles
Cyra (name), a feminine given name
Saint Cyra, Irish saint
CYRA, the IATA code for Gamètì/Rae Lakes Airport in Canada

See also